Eddie Walsh (1914–2006) was an Irish sportsperson.  He played Gaelic football with his local club Knocknagoshel and was a member of the Kerry senior inter-county team in the 1930s and 1940s.

Walsh won five All-Ireland Senior Football Championship medals (1937, 1939, 1940 1941 and 1946), and eight Munster Senior Football Championship medals with Kerry. He also won Railway Cup medals with Munster in 1941 and 1946. Walsh died in 2006 aged 92.

References

1914 births
2006 deaths
Knocknagoshel Gaelic footballers
Kerry inter-county Gaelic footballers
Munster inter-provincial Gaelic footballers